Julius Wu is an American animation director. He has directed several episodes of the animated series Family Guy.

Wu has also served as a director, assistant director and storyboard artist on King of the Hill and The Oblongs, before their cancellation.

Family Guy
Wu joined Family Guy in 2007, after leaving King of the Hill in 2005. He has since directed multiple episodes, including:
"The Tan Aquatic with Steve Zissou" (2007)
"Believe It or Not, Joe's Walking on Air" (2007)
"Baby Not on Board" (2008)
"420" (2009)
"Dog Gone" (2009)
"Peter-assment" (2010)
"Baby, You Knock Me Out" (2010)
"Brothers & Sisters" (2011)
"Stewie Goes for a Drive" (2011)
"Be Careful What You Fish For" (2012)
"Internal Affairs" (2012)
"Jesus, Mary and Joseph!" (2012)
"Bigfat" (2013)
"Vestigial Peter" (2013)
"Secondhand Spoke" (2014)
"Turkey Guys'' (2014)
"#JOLO" (2015)
"Brokeback Swanson" (2015)
"Run, Chris, Run" (2016)
"How the Griffin Stole Christmas" (2016)
"Peter's Lost Youth" (2017)
"The D in Apartment 23" (2017)
"'Family Guy' Through the Years" (2018)
"Dead Dog Walking" (2018)
"No Giggity, No Doubt" (2019)
 #340: "Short Cuts" (2020)
 #357: "Pawtucket Pat" (2020)

References

External links

American television directors
Living people
Place of birth missing (living people)
Year of birth missing (living people)
American storyboard artists